Beren is a political party in Kyrgyzstan. The party was registered on December 30, 2006, by former members of the Ar-Namys party, and advocates a parliamentary form of government.

References

Political parties in Kyrgyzstan